Estradasphere was an American experimental band that originated in Santa Cruz, California, during the late 1990s. The band, which in its last incarnation was based in Seattle, consisted of six multi-instrumentalists from a variety of musical backgrounds trained in disciplines ranging from classical music and jazz to heavy metal.

In November 2007, members of Estradasphere started touring with Amanda Palmer of The Dresden Dolls, as well as helping to produce her debut solo album Who Killed Amanda Palmer.

The band is on a "permanent hiatus" since 2010.

Music
Estradasphere were influenced by many different artists from many different subgenres, such as jazz, funk, techno, classical music, pop, heavy metal, New Age, Latin, Balkan, Greek and gypsy.  They were influenced by artists such as The Beach Boys and Secret Chiefs 3, and have been compared to Mr. Bungle, Frank Zappa and John Zorn. Similarly to Mr. Bungle and Secret Chiefs 3, the band mixes several genres in its songs.  The band was a self-proclaimed inventor of bizarre genres such as "Bulgarian Surf", "Romanian Gypsy-Metal", and "Spaghetti Eastern" and sounded like "Psychedelic-Sci-fi", "Gypsy-Metal-Jazz" and "Epic-Cinema-Thon", according to its MySpace.

In 1997, members of the group released an avant-garde metal album called Koolaide Moustache in Jonestown under the name Don Salsa.

Band members

Members 
According to www.estradasphere.com:
Tim Smolens - standup bass, electric bass, vocals, audio production/engineering
Timb Harris - violin, trumpet, mandolin, guitar, vocals
Jason Schimmel - guitar, keyboards, banjo, vocals
Lee Smith - drums
Kevin Kmetz - tsugaru shamisen, guitar, keyboards
Adam Stacey - accordion, keyboards, vocals

Former members
David Murray - drums
John Whooley - saxophone, accordion, vocals

Discography

Notes

External links
Estradasphere's official website
Estradasphere MySpace
The End Records  - website of Estradasphere's current record label.
Web of Mimicry - website for Estradasphere's former record label.
Obnoxious Listeners: Estradasphere

American experimental musical groups
Musical groups from California
Web of Mimicry artists